The following table is a list of chiefs of the Clan Mackintosh, a Highland Scottish clan. The 6th chief of Clan Mackintosh also became through marriage, the 7th chief of Clan Chattan, a confederation of Scottish clans that Mackintosh chief was chief of until 1938.

References

Mackintosh